A Very Strange Society: A Journey to the Heart of South Africa is a 1967 non-fiction book by Allen Drury. It explores the then-evolving government and culture of the Republic of South Africa.

Overview
Combining newspaper articles, interviews and government edicts, Drury presents the "achievements and failures" of the new republic, which was founded in 1961.

Critical reception
In  November 1967, Kirkus Reviews wrote:

References

External links
 

1967 non-fiction books
Apartheid in South Africa
Political books